Donal Lyons was the Mayor of Galway from 2001–02 and from 2014–15.

Biography
Lyons is a native of Castlebaldwin, County Sligo, but moved to Galway in the 1970s where he married Myra Mulveen of Shantalla, with whom he had Ciara and Aiblhe. A trade unionist, he joined the Progressive Democrats in 1986. He was co-opted to the Corporation in 1996 following the resignation of Liam Madden. In 1999 Lyons and his colleague, Paul Colleran, won two seats in the South Ward.

Elected in June 2001, he has stated that his most poignant memory while Mayor is of the Mass in the New Cathedral on Ireland's Day of Mourning for the September 11 attacks (in which Ann Maire McHugh of Tuam was killed). On 18 September he formally opened the new City Hall. He represented Galway at the International Conference of Sister Cities at Aalborg, and addressed the Massachusetts State Senate at the invitation of Jack Yunits and Tom Birmingham. He joined the celebrations of the town of Newry when it received its city status in June 2002.

References

 Role of Honour:The Mayors of Galway City 1485-2001, William Henry, Galway 2001.

External links
 https://web.archive.org/web/20071119083053/http://www.galwaycity.ie/AllServices/YourCouncil/HistoryofTheCityCouncil/PreviousMayors/

Year of birth missing (living people)
Living people
Mayors of Galway
Politicians from County Sligo
Politicians from County Galway
Progressive Democrats politicians
Local councillors in Galway (city)